Gebhard III may refer to:

 Gebhard (III) of Constance (ca. 1040 – 12 November 1110), Bishop of Constance
 Gebhard III (Bishop of Regensburg), bishop of Regensburg (or Ratisbon) from 1036 to 2 December 1060